Chaqal-e Mostafa (also Romanized as Chaqāl-e Moşţafá) is a village in Beygom Qaleh Rural District, in the Central District of Naqadeh County, West Azerbaijan Province, Iran. At the 2006 census, its population was 379, in 71 families.

References 

Populated places in Naqadeh County